UNC Finley Golf Course in Chapel Hill, North Carolina, is the home of the North Carolina Tar Heels men's and women's golf teams.  It was originally built by Raleigh businessman A. E. Finley in 1949 to a design by George Cobb.  Further holes were added in the 1980s along with renovation of the clubhouse.  In 1999, renowned designer Tom Fazio remolded the course into its current par 72 layout with five sets of tees ranging from 4,981 to 7,220 yards in length.

Scorecard

Golf clubs and courses in North Carolina
College golf clubs and courses in the United States
North Carolina Tar Heels sports venues
1949 establishments in North Carolina